Michael John Nelson (born 23 March 1980) is a former professional footballer who played as a defender. He is currently head first-team coach at Scunthorpe United.

Nelson has previously played for Scunthorpe United, Norwich City, Hartlepool United, Bury, Kilmarnock, Bradford City, Hibernian, Cambridge United, Barnet and Chesterfield.

Club career

Early career
Born in Gateshead, Tyne and Wear, Nelson started his playing career as a semi-professional, playing for non-League teams such as Spennymoor United, Leek Town and Bishop Auckland. Nelson's performances attracted the attention of league clubs who sent scouts to watch him. Nelson was given a trial at Hartlepool but he was not offered a contract by the then Hartlepool manager Chris Turner. However Nelson was offered a contract at Bury by manager Andy Preece after Bury scout Peter Ward convinced him to give Nelson a chance.

Bury
Once Nelson had settled down to professional football, he gradually became a first team regular and during his first full season at Bury he managed to play 31 of the club's 46 league matches, scoring 2 goals in the process. Nelson formed a defensive partnership with Danny Swailes. However, during the season Nelson suffered what he described as the worst injury of his career after suffering a collapsed lung and several cracked ribs after a collision during Bury's match against Wigan Athletic. Nelson had to have a drain inserted into his chest for several days while he was hospitalised. The injury threatened to keep him sidelined for three months but remarkably Nelson was able to resume training less than three weeks later.

Despite being dropped early on, Nelson's second season turned out to be even more successful as he played in 40 of Bury's 46 matches, scoring 5 goals. Nelson was made club captain and his performances earned him the respect of the club's players and fans. During that season, Bury manager Andy Preece hailed Nelson as "the best centre-half in Division Three". However, Bury failed to gain promotion to League 1 as they missed out during the play-offs and Nelson was offered the chance to play in a higher division by several League 1 clubs.

Hartlepool United
The following season, Nelson joined Hartlepool United on the same day that Neale Cooper was appointed manager for a fee of around £70,000. Nelson was seen as natural replacement for Graeme Lee who had joined Sheffield Wednesday. Nelson started strongly for Hartlepool and scored the winner from 30 yards during his debut in Hartlepool's 4–3 win over Peterborough. This goal almost earned him another award as it was on the shortlist for Hartlepool's Goal of the Season. He was also voted September's Player of the Month on the official Hartlepool website. Nelson began to form a strong partnership with Chris Westwood and the pair played together for the majority of Hartlepool's games. Nelson went on to play in 40 of Hartlepool's league matches and played in both legs of Hartlepool's play-off semi-final match against Bristol City. Nelson was in contention for Hartlepool's Fans and Players' Player of the season but he missed out to Jim Provett on both occasions.

However Nelson failed to maintain this through to the 2004–05 season and he handed in a transfer request. His agent claimed that he'd been "promised" a better deal. This triggered a feud with Hartlepool chairman Ken Hodcroft who criticised Nelson and his agent. Nelson was missing in several of Hartlepool's matches and was rumoured to be signing for Hull City for a fee of around £100,000. However Nelson withdrew his transfer request and was reinstalled into the starting line-up. His performances earned him an improved contract and he was offered a new three-year contract that would tie him to the club until 2008.

Nelson's third season of the club saw him receiving his first red card for Hartlepool after he retaliated and elbowed Jack Lester during Hartlepool's defeat to Nottingham Forest. He was the favoured central defender alongside Ben Clark during the 2006–07 campaign, playing a major part in the 18 game unbeaten run along with Dimitrios Konstantopoulos in goal. The season also saw him take the captain's armband in the absence on Michael Barron.

Nelson was named in the PFA League Two Team of the Year for the 2006–07 season.

Norwich City
In June 2009, Nelson agreed to join Norwich City, who had just been relegated to League One, on a two-year deal once his contract at Hartlepool expired at the end of the month. He made his debut in the 7–1 opening-day thrashing at the hands of Colchester, and did not play for the first team again until the game against his former club Hartlepool later in August, in which he scored a magnificent overhead kick. It was his first goal for Norwich and put the Canaries on course for a 2–0 win at Victoria Park. Nelson established himself as a regular starter following an injury to teammate Jens Berthel Askou in December. He subsequently formed a strong central defensive partnership with Gary Doherty as Norwich surged up the League One table, overhauling runaway leaders Leeds United in the process. On 17 April 2010, he scored the only goal in a 1–0 victory at Charlton Athletic which secured Norwich's return to the Championship at the first attempt. Nelson's scored his third goal for Norwich in a 2–0 win over Gillingham. In his second season, Nelson scored his fourth goal against Watford in a 3–2 loss in Norwich City's first match of the season. Nelson scored his fifth and last goal for Norwich against Sheffield United in a 4–2 win. Nelson remained in the first team for Norwich City until he suffered a foot injury. Following his return from injury, Nelson was targeting the first team but was deemed surplus to requirements by Canaries boss Paul Lambert as Lambert favoured Elliott Ward and Leon Barnett as their first choice centre back. Nelson is held in very high esteem by Norwich City fans for his performances during the successful League One campaign. He received a standing ovation from Carrow Road on his return with new club Scunthorpe United.

Scunthorpe United
He left the Canaries on deadline day in January 2011 for an undisclosed fee, joining Scunthorpe United, just an hour from the deadline. Nelson made his debut for Scunthorpe United in a disastrous 5–1 defeat to Hull City. At the end of the season, Scunthorpe were relegated to League One. Nelson scored his first goal for Scunthorpe in a 1–1 draw against Wycombe Wanderers. Scunthorpe's poor form continued and at the end of 2011 the club was just above the relegation zone to League Two. In January 2012, Nelson was strongly linked with move away from Scunthorpe following a restructuring programme at the club.

Kilmarnock
On 14 January 2012, Nelson signed for Scottish Premier League side Kilmarnock, a two-and-a-half-year contract. After the move, Manager Kenny Shiels described new signing Nelson as 'quality' and expected Nelson will be good asset in the second half of the season. Shortly joining, Nelson revealed that then Norwich City manager Paul Lambert made a recommendation of Nelson joining Kilmarnock. Nelson had to wait until on 4 February 2012 when he made his debut, playing in the central defence, in a 1–1 draw against Dunfermline Athletic. Then on 18 March, he played in the 2012 Scottish League Cup Final which Kilmarnock won after beating Celtic 1–0. A week after the Scottish League Cup Final, Nelson scored his first goal for the club in a 4–3 thriller victory over Inverness Caledonian Thistle The next season, Nelson continued to retain his first team place until he left and start his new season when he scored his first goal in the second round of Scottish League Cup, in a 2–1 loss against Stenhousemuir and he soon scored his second goal for the club in a 2–1 loss against St Johnstone on 24 November 2012.

Bradford City

On 15 January 2013, Nelson agreed to join Bradford City on an 18-month deal for an undisclosed fee. Thirty days later, on 15 February 2013, when asked why Nelson was sold, Shiels then explained his decision selling Nelson, that he wanted to be close with his children and described his departure as a "big loss". He made his debut on 2 February, in a 2–2 draw away to Fleetwood Town. Nelson was an unused substitute as Bradford won promotion to League One by winning the 2013 Football League Two play-off Final.

Hibernian
On 1 August 2013 Nelson signed a two-year deal with Scottish Premiership side Hibernian, moving from Bradford City for a nominal transfer fee. Nelson agreed to have his contract terminated at the end of the season following Hibernian's relegation to the Scottish Championship.

Cambridge United
On 26 August 2014, Nelson signed a one-year contract with League Two side Cambridge United shortly after agreeing mutual termination with his previous club Hibernian.

On 30 August 2014, he made his debut for the club, starting the whole game, in a 5–0 win against Carlisle United. Two weeks later on 13 September 2014, Nelson scored his first goal for Cambridge United, in a 3–2 win against Dagenham & Redbridge. Since joining the club, he quickly established himself in the first team as the first choice centre–back position. Nelson scored on his return from the sidelines, in a 2–1 loss against Accrington Stanley on 21 November 2014. Four weeks later on 19 December 2014, he scored his third goal for Cambridge United, in a 1–1 draw against Tranmere Rovers. At the end of the 2014–15 season, Nelson made forty appearances and scoring three times in all competitions. On 6 May 2015, the club did not offer him a new deal when his contract expired.

Barnet
Nelson joined Barnet on trial in 2015–16 pre-season, and signed a one-year deal on 3 August. Upon joining the club, he was reunited with Martin Allen, whom he knows during their time at Portsmouth. Nelson was also given a number six shirt ahead of the new season.

On 11 August 2015, he made his debut for Barnet, starting a match and played 89 minutes before being substituted, in a 2–1 win against Millwall in the first round of the League Cup. Since joining the club, Nelson found himself in and out of the starting line–up, which saw him placed on the substitute bench. On 19 December 2015, however, he suffered a dislocated shoulder injury and was substituted at half time, in a 4–2 win against Crawley Town. Initially, Nelson was given all clear with a shoulder injury, but he was sidelined for three months. On 13 February 2016, Nelson scored on his return from injury, in a 2–0 win against Dagenham & Redbridge. Following his return from injury, he regained his first team place, playing in the centre–back position, but his form later dipped towards the end of the season and was placed on the substitute bench. At the end of the 2015–16 season, Nelson went on to make thirty–two appearances and scoring once in all competitions. On 25 May 2016, he signed a one–year contract extension with Barnet.

Ahead of the 2016–17 season, Nelson was appointed as the new captain of Barnet following the departure of Andy Yiadom. He continued to establish himself in the first team in the centre–back position, as well as, regaining his captaincy. On 15 March 2017, Nelson scored his first goal of the season from an equalising header, in a 2–2 draw against Yeovil Town on 15 March 2017. Since the start of the 2016–17 season, Nelson started in every match until he was dropped to the substitute bench for three matches between 8 April 2017 and 17 April 2017. On 22 April 2017, Nelson returned to the starting line–up from the sidelines and helped the club keep a clean sheet, in a 2–0 win against his former club, Hartlepool United. Throughout the 2016–17 season, he assisted three times for John Akinde, who went on to become the club's top scorer this season. In his second season at Barnet, Nelson went on to make forty–six appearances and scoring once in all competitions. On 1 June 2017, he signed a new deal at the end of the season and extended his contract into a third year in summer 2017, as well as, taking up a role as the club's under-23 team coach.

At the start of the 2017–18 season, Nelson continued to fight for his first team place in the centre–back position, as well as, regaining his captaincy. Because he had to fight for his place in the first team, Nelson found himself out of the starting line–up, due to being placed on the substitute bench and his own injury concerns. Amid to this on 13 January 2018, he started the whole game, in his 100th appearance for Barnet, losing 2–0 against Crawley Town. Following the appointment of Graham Westley as head coach, Nelson was appointed as his assistant for the first team. He previously coached the club's U23 side between September and March. But Nelson returned to playing duties following the appointment of Martin Allen and on 30 March 2018, he made his first appearances for Barnet in two months, starting a match and played 77 minutes before being substituted, in a 2–1 win against Crewe Alexandra. However, Nelson was unable to help the club avoid relegation despite winning their last three league matches of the season. At the end of the 2017–18 season, he went on to make twenty–nine appearances in all competitions.

Barnet claimed to have offered Nelson a new contract at the end of the 2017–18 season, but this was disputed by the player himself.

Chesterfield
Nelson signed a one-year deal with Chesterfield on 22 May 2018. Upon joining the club, manager Martin Allen said: "Michael is a very old player with great experience and good knowledge. He is a leader of men, and he knows how to win games. He is as fit as a butcher's dog, and he is a great man to work with."

Nelson made his debut for Chesterfield, starting the whole game, and helped the club keep a clean sheet, in a 1–0 win against Ebbsfleet United in the opening game of the season. He helped Chesterfield keep two clean sheets in the next two matches against Aldershot Town and Braintree Town. Since making his debut for the club, Nelson became a first team regular in the first two months to the season. However, by October, he was dropped from the starting eleven squad and didn't play for three months. On 4 December 2018, Nelson was placed on a transfer list by manager Allen. But on 26 December 2018, he made his first appearance for Chesterfield against Solihull Moors, starting a match, only to come off in the 9th minute, in a 4–0 loss, in what turned out to be his last appearance for the club. Following this, Nelson spent the rest of the 2018–19 season, combining his role as Chesterfield player with coaching staff duties. At the end of the 2018–19 season, he went on to make thirteen appearances in all competitions. Shortly after, Nelson was released by the club.

Gateshead
In the summer of 2019, Nelson signed for his home town club, Gateshead, as a player-coach. On 10 August 2019, he made his début for the club, starting a match and played 67 minutes before being substituted, in a 0–0 draw at AFC Telford United. On 1 September 2019, Nelson scored his first goal for Gateshead, in a 2–0 win against Brackley Town. During his time at the club, he made thirteen appearances and scoring once in all competitions.

Coaching career
Nelson was appointed assistant manager of Stevenage on 17 January 2020, once again assisting Graham Westley whom he had worked alongside at Barnet. Nelson left the club a month later after Alex Revell was appointed manager.

Nelson returned to playing when he joined Blyth Spartans on 26 February 2020 until the end of the season. A week later on 4 March 2020, he was then made player-manager after the departure of Lee Clark. Three days later on 7 March 2020, Nelson's first game in charge came against Brackley Town, as the club lost 5–2. However, the 2019–20 season was ended early because of the COVID-19 pandemic. On 1 May 2020, he was appointed as a permanent manager at Blyth Spartans. Upon doing so, Nelson retired from professional football.

Ahead of the 2020–21 season, Nelson made new signings, with a help from the "Impact of the Future Fund" and "the 1899 Club" support groups and praised the groups for their role in helping him bring in new players. However, Blyth Spartans struggled in the league, winning only once in fourteen league matches before the season was ended early because of the COVID-19 pandemic for the second time. During the 2020–21 season, he once came out of retirement as a replacement for the suspended Matthew Elsdon and played in the FA Cup match against Marske United, as the club lost 1–0. On 17 November 2021, with Blyth in the relegation zone of the National League North, Nelson left the club by mutual consent.

On 1 December 2021, Nelson joined his former club Hartlepool United as assistant manager to the newly appointed Graeme Lee. Following the departure of Lee, Nelson was named as the club's caretaker manager on 5 May 2022. He left the club on 7 June 2022.

On 1 September 2022, Nelson returned to another one of his former clubs when he joined Scunthorpe United to assist interim manager Tony Daws. On 28 November 2022, Daws stepped down to return to his role as academy manager with Nelson becoming interim manager. Following a club takeover and appointment of a new permanent manager in Jimmy Dean, Nelson was retained as head coach.

Personal life
Nelson is married to his wife, Dawn and together, they have two children. He revealed he has a tattoo on his arm of his first little boy, who was stillborn in 2002.

Career statistics

Managerial statistics
Updated 28 January 2023:

Honours

Club
Hartlepool United
Football League Two runners-up: 2006–07

Norwich City
Football League One: 2009–10

Kilmarnock
Scottish League Cup: 2011–12

Individual
Bury Player of the Year: 2002–03
PFA League Two Team of the Year: 2007

References

External links

1980 births
Living people
Footballers from Gateshead
English footballers
Association football defenders
Leek Town F.C. players
Spennymoor United F.C. players
Bishop Auckland F.C. players
Bury F.C. players
Hartlepool United F.C. players
Norwich City F.C. players
Scunthorpe United F.C. players
Kilmarnock F.C. players
Bradford City A.F.C. players
Hibernian F.C. players
Cambridge United F.C. players
Barnet F.C. players
Barnet F.C. non-playing staff
Chesterfield F.C. players
Gateshead F.C. players
Stevenage F.C. non-playing staff
Blyth Spartans A.F.C. players
Blyth Spartans A.F.C. managers
Hartlepool United F.C. non-playing staff
Hartlepool United F.C. managers
Scunthorpe United F.C. non-playing staff
Scunthorpe United F.C. managers
English Football League players
English Football League managers
National League (English football) players
National League (English football) managers
Scottish Premier League players
Scottish Professional Football League players
English football managers